Huw Thomas Waters (born 26 September 1986) is a former Welsh cricketer. He was a right-handed batsman and a right-arm fast-medium-pace bowler, who played for Glamorgan.

He attended the Sixth Form at Monmouth School, and was ever-present in the School 1st XI cricket team, before making his debut for Glamorgan in 2005.

He was named in the England Under-19s' tour of Bangladesh, but had to withdraw his place because of an injury to his wrist. He was subsequently able to return to the squad, thanks to the subsequent withdrawal of Richard Jones from the team.

Waters went to Australia for the best part of six months playing his professional sport there.

In 2012, he topped the first-class batting averages for Glamorgan, with a batting average of 53.00. This was mainly because Waters was not out 12 times out of 14 innings.

Glamorgan and England had high hopes for the man dubbed "The next Simon Jones" for his ability to reverse swing the ball at good pace, but Waters' potential was not realised, as he was forced to retire in August 2014 due to exercise-induced dystonia.

Career best performances
as of 19 November 2012

External links

1986 births
Living people
Welsh cricketers
Glamorgan cricketers
People educated at Monmouth School for Boys
Wales National County cricketers